Fred Schnier Building is a historic commercial building located at Washington, Franklin County, Missouri. It was built about 1883, and is a two-story, narrow rectangular brick building with a flat roof.  It has a two-story rear addition with a one-story extension. It has a large storefront on the first floor and residence on the second floor.

It was listed on the National Register of Historic Places in 2000.

References

Commercial buildings on the National Register of Historic Places in Missouri
Commercial buildings completed in 1883
Buildings and structures in Franklin County, Missouri
National Register of Historic Places in Franklin County, Missouri
1883 establishments in Missouri